Defense Establishment Comptroller Unit is an Israel Defense Forces unit which supervises and oversees the fitness, preparedness, and legality of the Israeli Security Forces' activities, in all its parts. It reports to the Minister of Defense, Director-general of the Ministry of Defense, and the Chief of Staff on these issues. 


History

The Defense Establishment Comptroller Unit was established in 1976. It was originally subordinate to what then the Operations Directorate (the most senior branch in the IDF). In 1994, it was placed under the deputy head of the Operations Directorate. In 2004, it was placed under the command of the Deputy Chief of Staff. 

Unlike other IDF units, the Defense Establishment Comptroller Unit is headed by a civilian, who is one of three civilian members in the General Staff. In August 2002, the Defense Establishment Comptroller was Brigadier-General (Ret.) Yossi Beinhorn.

References

External links
Moshe Barda, Summary of the State Comptroller reports, submitted to the Knesset Committee for State Comptrollership, March 2003  
Eliezer Goldberg (Israel's State Comptroller, "The internal comptrollership in the IDF", NFC, August 31, 2005 

Military units and formations of Israel
Comptrollers in Israel